David Paul Kuhn is an American writer, and political analyst, whose most recent book,The Hardhat Riot: Nixon, New York City, and the Dawn of the White Working-Class Revolution, was recognized by The New York Times as one of the "100 Notable Books of 2020."

Career

Kuhn regularly analyzes American politics for networks including BBC and Fox News Channel. Kuhn has served as the chief political writer for CBS, a senior political writer for Politico, and as chief political correspondent for RealClearPolitics. His work has appeared in news outlets including The Washington Post, The New York Times, Salon, National Review, Washington Monthly, The Atlantic and The Wall Street Journal.

Early in his career, Kuhn reported on the United States for the Tokyo-based Yomiuri Shimbun. During this period, Kuhn covered issues including anthrax, North Korean nuclear negotiations, and the September 11th attacks. He wrote about his experience at the Twin Towers, on September 11, 2001, in the book At Ground Zero.

Kuhn frequently writes about the white working class in the context of American politics, the male side of the gender gap, and why Democrats struggle to win white voters, particularly blue collar whites.

In the Wall Street Journal in 2020, former Senator Jim Webb called Kuhn an "unacknowledged prophet" because "over the past 15 years few writers have covered this realignment" of "white working people" from the Democratic Party to the GOP with "the consistency of David Paul Kuhn, whose warnings about the reasons white working people were moving away from the Democrats were largely dismissed by the news media and party elites." The Washington Examiner also called Kuhn "prescient about the rise of Trump's coalition."

Books
Kuhn's first book, The Neglected Voter: White Men and the Democratic Dilemma, was published in 2007 and received wide praise.

Kuhn's second book, the political novel What Makes It Worthy, was published in 2015. According to the New York Post, the book is based on Kuhn's experience covering presidential campaigns and presents a "fictionalized account of two reporters on the campaign trail", but "comparisons of characters to real-life political figures will naturally be made" because of the use of composite characters. Kirkus Reviews wrote the novel has a "genuinely tender love story" and "insightful political commentary."

The Hardhat Riot: Nixon, New York City, and the Dawn of the White Working-Class Revolution, was published in July 2020. It was a New York Times Book Review Editors' Choice. The Washington Post book review called it "engrossing, well-crafted," "deeply researched," adding that "Kuhn writes with empathy for both sides" and "concludes with a sharp analysis of how the revolt of the white working-class almost immediately reshaped American politics."The New York Times review called it a "compelling narrative." In The New Yorker, Jill Lepore wrote that The Hardhat Riot was a "riveting book." The New York Daily News reported that the book, which tells the story of the Hard Hat Riot of May 8, 1970, as well as the antecedents and aftermath, is about how a "day changed American politics, perhaps forever," and also, according to The Washington Examiner, the book "details a series of wrenching national events" that "explains in elegant and expert fashion" how, in 2016, Donald Trump "won so much support among blue-collar white voters." The Wall Street Journal book review also wrote that the book "insightfully explains why and how" the white working-class tilted "the 2016 election to Donald Trump," centered around the microcosm of a "riveting account of the May 1970 explosion of New York's blue-collar workers."New York magazine's "Approval Matrix" placed the book in its quadrant for "brilliant" and "highbrow."

References

External links

American male journalists
American male novelists
21st-century American novelists
Living people
21st-century American male writers
21st-century American non-fiction writers
Year of birth missing (living people)